Sinocyclocheilus huanglongdongensis is a species of cyprinid fish endemic to China.

References 

huanglongdongensis
Fish described in 2004